Badaling Great Wall railway station, also translated as Badalingchangcheng railway station, is a railway station in Badaling scenic area, Yanqing District, Beijing.

The architectural design manages to extend the mountain and the natural landscape within the resort itself.

This station is designed by AREP and China Railway Engineering Consulting Group, and constructed by China Railway 5th Engineering Group. On ,  the station building successfully capped, marking the completion of all station buildings on Jingzhang HSR.

See also 
 Beijing–Zhangjiakou intercity railway
 Beijing North railway station

References 

Stations on the Beijing–Zhangjiakou Intercity Railway
Railway stations in China opened in 2019
Railway stations in Beijing